The Democratic Progressive Party (abbreviation: DPP) is an opposition political party in Singapore.

History and political development
From a splinter group from the Workers' Party, the party was founded by the former party's Assistant Secretary-General Seow Khee Leng on 16 March 1973, under the name of United Front. On 5 March 1982, the party was renamed to Singapore United Front, to avoid confusion with the name of another party, United People's Front.

During the campaigning in the 1984 general election, SUF's chief Seow was sued by Lee Kuan Yew (who was then the Prime Minister of Singapore) alongside the members of People's Action Party for slandering defamatory remarks made at two rally speeches that Lee and his cabinet were guilty of corruption. Seow was ordered to pay Lee and the PAP S$250,000 worth of damages and costs each, and by 3 February 1989, Seow was made bankrupt after being unable to keep up with the payments for the damages owned from two separate but similar libel suits brought by PM Lee and the PAP government.

In January 1988, the party merged with Workers' Party to contest the 1988 general election. SUF was temporarily defunct until in 1992, Seow and former WP members revived the party, and renamed it to its current name, Democratic Progressive Party.

Former WP member Tan Soo Phuan and his son Lead Shake stood as candidates for the party in the 1997 and 2001 general elections, though they did not achieve much electoral success, both saw the candidates losing their electoral deposits for failing to garner the necessary threshold of 12.5% of the valid votes cast (Soo Phuan in the 1997 election in Chua Chu Kang SMC, and Lead Shake in the 2001 election in Ayer Rajah SMC).
	
In July 2002, both father and son were subsequently expelled from the DPP, both for breaching party's orders during the 2001 elections without informing the party first (Soo Phuan did not inform his decision to contest MacPherson SMC, while Lead Shake contested Ayer Rajah instead of Joo Chiat SMC).

After more than a decade of inactivity, in December 2012, Seow invited a group of former members of the Singapore People's Party (SPP) including Benjamin Pwee and Mohamad Hamim Bin Aliyas (SPP's founding member) to join and take over the leadership of the party. Pwee was appointed as the party's Acting Secretary-General in January 2013. At an Ordinary Party Congress meeting held on 31 March 2013, Hamim and Pwee were officially elected as the party's chairman and Secretary-General respectively.

Pursuant to a Memorandum of Agreement signed in August 2015, Pwee and Hamim resigned from DPP to return to SPP to help their team contest Bishan–Toa Payoh Group Representation Constituency in the 2015 general election. However, the SPP team obtained only 26.41% of the valid votes. The duo returned to the DPP soon after.

In 2018, they were present in a meeting with six other opposition parties (Singaporeans First, Singapore Democratic Party, People's Power Party, National Solidarity Party, and People's Voice Party (formed by former NSP chief Lim Tean)), along with former PAP MP and Presidential Candidate Tan Cheng Bock, on the possibility of forming a collation (led by Tan) for the next election.

On 19 February 2019, Pwee revealed that he had resigned from the secretary-general post and joined Singapore Democratic Party ahead of the forthcoming general election, four days later. Hamim took over as the new secretary-general and leader, while organising secretary Ting Tze Jiang became chairman. Although expressed their intention and prepared to contest in the 2020 Singaporean general election, however, on 27 June 2020, the party announced that they would not be participating in the election and instead backed other smaller parties such as RP and PPP.

Objectives and policies
A statement dated 22 April 2013 on the DPP website states "The way forward is to build a society that is equal and egalitarian to all citizens."

A statement dated 16 August 2015 on the DPP website sets out the following policies or proposals:

Employment: Additional policy measures to ensure a “Singaporeans-first” domestic job market, especially in middle-to-upper management in the civil service and government-linked companies, as well as the private sector.
Foreign workers: Restrictions to foreign workers in Singapore by industrial sectors, allowing sectors like F&B where fewer Singaporeans are trained for or are interested to work, to employ more foreign workers. And for sectors like engineering, healthcare, banking, to have tighter restrictions, to allow Singaporean PMETs to take on these middle-income jobs more easily.
Re-skilling: better, more hands-on, more commonplace apprenticeship-based re-skilling programmes for middle-aged workers, rather than classroom-based, taught WDA/WSQ-type programmes that do not fit these middle-aged workers’ learning styles.
SMEs: practical support for SMEs, including setting up an SME assistance centre, a job-matching programme, a revolving loan fund, an incubation programme, and a mentor-coaching programme, to help owners and managers of SMEs to get back on their feet and become self-sustainable in their businesses.
Entrepreneurs: policy measures to complement the government’s existing range of solutions, to better help local entrepreneurs start a business and earn a living. This includes those in the design, arts, construction, manufacturing and other sectors.
Central Provident Fund/retirement: a wider range of options and retirement savings programmes that Singaporeans can choose from. Key leaders in the private sector insurance and investment industry to be called upon to come up with better investment and insurance schemes under the CPF structure, to fill in the current gaps in the CPF system.
Malay-Muslim issues: identifying and challenging more Malay-Muslim PMETs to step forward as next-generation community leaders, and together find new solutions for the Malay-Muslim community.

Organisation and structure

Central Executive Committee
As of 23 February 2019, the CEC consist of:

Electoral performance
In the 2015 elections, the party was temporarily merged with Singapore People's Party; The results in the list display only the results earned in their contested constituency (Bishan–Toa Payoh Group Representation Constituency)

Parliamentary by-election results (as United Front)

References

External links
Official Website of DPP
SgSL: General Election - Democratic Progressive Party (DPP) Democratic Progressive Party (DPP) party symbol, explained by SADeafSG

1973 establishments in Singapore
Democratic socialist parties in Asia
Political parties established in 1973
Political parties in Singapore
Progressive parties
Socialist parties in Singapore